Mary Tate Engels (born March 27, 1943) is an American writer of almost thirty romance novels since 1982 as Tate McKenna and Mary Tate Engels. She has co-written five romance novels under the pseudonyms Cory Kenyon and Corey Keaton with Vicki Lewis Thompson and two non-fiction books for Texas Tech University Press. She lives with her husband in Tucson, Arizona.

Bibliography

As Tate McKenna

Single Novels
Captive Desire (1982)
Legacy of Love (1983)
Enduring Love (1983)
Daring Proposal (1983)
Love's Dawning (1984)
The Perfect Touch (1984)
Man of the Hour (1985)
Love Is All That Matters (1985)
A Wild and Reckless Love (1985)
A Man to Remember (1986)
Partners in Peril (1986)
Sweet Revenge (1986)
Island of Secrets (1987)
Callahan's Gold (1987)

Hal Kammerman Series
Kindle the Fires (1983)
Two Separate Lives (1985)

Collections
Legacy of Love / Captive Desire (1992)

As Mary Tate Engels

Single Novels
Speak to the Wind	1988/08
The Right Time	1989/03
A Rare Breed	1992/11

New Mexico Series
Best-Laid Plans	1989/09
Ripe for the Picking	1990/03

Clements Saga
Hard to Resist	1991/06
Loved by the Best	1991/10

Non-Fiction
Tales from Wide Ruins: Jean and Bill Cousins, Traders (1996)
Corazón Contento: Sonoran Recipes and Stories from the Heart (1999) (with Madeline Gallego Thorpe)

References and Resources

1943 births
Living people
American romantic fiction writers
Place of birth missing (living people)
Writers from Arizona